Areobiotrematidae is a family of flatworms belonging to the order Azygiida.

Genera:
 Areobiotrema

References

Platyhelminthes